3-Nitrobenzaldehyde is an organic aromatic compound containing a nitro group meta-substituted to an aldehyde. 3-Nitrobenzaldehyde is the primary product obtained via the mono-nitration of benzaldehyde with nitric acid.

Synthesis

The synthesis of 3-nitrobenzaldehyde is accomplished via nitration of benzaldehyde, which yields mostly the meta-isomer. Product distribution is about 19% for the ortho-, 72% for the meta- and 9% for the para isomers.

Uses
3-Nitrobenzaldehyde is a precursor to the drug Tipranavir. It is a mainstay in the synthesis of Dihydropyridine calcium channel blockers.  Via selective reduction of the nitro group, it is a precursor to the diazonium salt.

References

Benzaldehydes
Nitrobenzenes